Dr. Alejandro Allub (born 1 December 1976, Córdoba) is a former Argentine rugby union footballer.  He played as a lock. He works as a pediatrician.

Career 
Allub played for Jockey Club, in Córdoba, Argentina, and for USA Perpignan, in France. He received 29 caps for Argentina, from 1997 to 2001, scoring 1 try, 5 points in aggregate. He was a member of the "Pumas" squad that participated at the 1999 Rugby World Cup finals, playing five matches and scoring the single try of his international career.

Allub had to leave high competition in 2001 after experiencing an acute myocardical infarction.

References

External links 

Interview with Alejandro Allub (In Spanish)

1976 births
Living people
Argentine rugby union players
Rugby union locks
Argentina international rugby union players
Sportspeople from Córdoba, Argentina